Induszalim is an extinct genus of mesoeucrocodylian reptile from the Vitakri Formation (Alam 19 locality) of Balochistan, Pakistan. It is known from a single specimen, the holotype, which consists of a single snout and jaw. The rostrum was originally referred to the theropod dinosaur "Vitakridrinda sulaimani". The type, and only species, I. bala, was named and described in 2006.

References 

Mesoeucrocodylians
Prehistoric pseudosuchian genera
Fossil taxa described in 2006